131 Ponce de Leon Avenue, also known as the Gulf Oil Building, is the name of a former building in Midtown Atlanta at the southeast corner of Ponce de Leon Avenue and Juniper Street, as well as the name of a mixed-use development which incorporates portions of the Pei building's façade, adding 321 apartments and  of retail space.

The building was architect I. M. Pei's first project, built in 1949, a  two-story "box that invoked the lean rectilinearity of Mies van der Rohe".

The mixed-use development incorporates the entire block bounded by Ponce de Leon Avenue, North Avenue, Piedmont Avenue and Juniper Street, except for St. Paul's church. A joint venture between real estate investment company Sereo Group Inc. and developer Faison Enterprises bought the  site in 2012.

In 2008, the block had been proposed for redevelopment as the "Fountain on Ponce" complex, but that project did not go through.

The building was demolished in February 2013, but the Atlanta Preservation Center stated that its understanding that a portion of the façade was to be "resurrected as a shell" and incorporated into the new complex. The demolition involved taking apart the building piece by piece. The front portion of the building was then reconstructed for use as the clubhouse and offices of the mixed use development.

References

External links
Photo of Pei building on Skyline Views (blog)

Demolished buildings and structures in Atlanta
I. M. Pei buildings
Mixed-use developments in Georgia (U.S. state)
Office buildings completed in 1949
Office buildings in Atlanta